Arctic is a quarterly, peer-reviewed, multidisciplinary, scientific journal, published by the Arctic Institute of North America. The focus of Arctic is original research articles on all topics about or related to the northern polar and sub-polar regions of the world. Additional published formats are book reviews, profiles of notable persons, specific geographic locations, notable northern events, commentaries, letters to the editor, and a general interest section consisting of essays and institute news. Mutltidisciplinary coverage encompasses physical sciences, social sciences, biological sciences, humanities, engineering, and technology. The journal was first published in spring of 1948.

Since at least March 2018, a fake journal pretending to be the real Arctic has set up a website. The real journal is hosted through the University of Calgary.

Abstracting and indexing
Arctic is indexed in the following databases:

Science Citation Index
Current Contents/Agriculture, Biology & Environmental Sciences
The Zoological Record
BIOSIS Previews

See also
Arctic Institute of North America
ASTIS database
Environmental Monitoring and Assessment
Canadian Journal for Netherlandic Studies
Area
GeoJournal
Journal of the Royal Geographical Society of London

References

External links
 About Arctic Journal
 Arctic Institute of North America Website

Environmental science journals
Geography journals
Zoology journals
Engineering journals
Publications established in 1948
English-language journals
Quarterly journals
Area studies journals
Works about the Arctic
Hijacked journals